The Colegio Menor campus Quito is located in Quito, Ecuador, South America.
It is the lower school of the Universidad San Francisco de Quito, and was founded in 1988.

Division
The school is divided into four sections:
 Early Childhood, grades playgroup-Kinder, 1st grade
 Elementary school, grades 2-5
 Middle school, grades 6-8
 High school, grades 9-12

References

International schools in Quito
American international schools in Ecuador
Private schools in Ecuador
Educational institutions established in 1988
1988 establishments in Ecuador